Strellc i Ulët (in Albanian) or Donji Streoc, is a village in the Deçan municipality of western Kosovo, located between Deçan and Peć along the mountainous border with Albania. The majority of inhabitants are ethnic Albanians.

Notes

References

Villages in Deçan